Central Delhi is an administrative district of the National Capital Territory of Delhi in India. It is bounded by the Yamuna River on the east and by the districts of North Delhi to the north, West Delhi and South West Delhi to the west, New Delhi to the south, and East Delhi to the east across the Yamuna. Administratively, the district is divided into three subdivisions, Civil Lines, Karol Bagh, and Kotwali, Delhi.

Central Delhi business district and high rises. It includes Shahjahanabad (Old Delhi), which served as the capital of the Mughal Empire, and is home to the monuments like the Red Fort and the Jama Masjid, Delhi's principal mosque.

Demographics

According to the 2011 census Central Delhi has a population of 582,320, roughly equal to the nation of Solomon Islands or the US state of Wyoming. This gives it a ranking of 531st in India (out of a total of 640). Its population growth rate over the decade 2001–2011 was −10.48%. Central Delhi has a sex ratio of 892 females for every 1000 males, and a literacy rate of 85.25%.

The readjusted Central Delhi district has a population of 894,389, of which 876,643 (98.02%) live in urban areas. The readjusted district has a sex ratio of 876 females per 1000 males. Scheduled Castes make up 197,123 (22.04%) of the population. 

At the time of the 2011 census, 85.05% of the population spoke Hindi, 4.27% Punjabi, 3.59% Urdu, 1.16% Bhojpuri and 1.05% Bengali as their first language.

See also
 Districts of Delhi

References

External links

 Central Delhi District official website
 Central Delhi District Census 2011 Data

Central Delhi district
Districts of Delhi